David McEwan (born 26 December 1981 in Lanark) is a Scottish former footballer. He played as a goalkeeper.

In his career he has played for Livingston, Clyde (on loan), Hamilton Academical (on loan and then permanently), Alloa Athletic, Dumbarton and Irish side Derry City.

Career

McEwan began his career in the youth team of Livingston, before being loaned out to Clyde and Hamilton Academical.

After being released by Livi in 2004, he made his loan spell at Hamilton permanent. After over 100 appearances for Accies, he moved for a short time to Recreation Park to play for Alloa Athletic.

He then spent a season in Ireland with Derry City.

McEwan signed for Dumbarton in May 2008 after leaving Derry City, but was released at the end of the 2009–10 season.  He then joined the Junior ranks with Larkhall Thistle.

Honours
Livingston
Scottish First Division (second tier): Winners 2000–01

Dumbarton
Scottish Division Three (fourth tier): Winners 2008–09

References

External links

1982 births
Living people
Sportspeople from Lanark
People educated at Coltness High School
Scottish footballers
Association football goalkeepers
Livingston F.C. players
Clyde F.C. players
Hamilton Academical F.C. players
Alloa Athletic F.C. players
Derry City F.C. players
League of Ireland players
Dumbarton F.C. players
Scottish Premier League players
Scottish Football League players
Scotland under-21 international footballers
Place of birth missing (living people)
Larkhall Thistle F.C. players
Footballers from South Lanarkshire
Scottish Junior Football Association players